The 2015 Kwara State gubernatorial election occurred in Nigeria on April 12, 2015. Incumbent APC Governor Abdulfatah Ahmed won re-election for a second term, defeating PDP Simon Ajibola and 15 other party candidates.

Abdulfatah Ahmed won the primary election after he was returned as the sole candidate. He picked Kayode Alabi as his running mate. Simon Ajibola was the PDP candidate with Alhaji Yinka Aluko as his running mate. 16 candidates contested in the election.

Electoral system
The Governor of Kwara State is elected using the plurality voting system.

Primary election

APC primary
The APC primary election was held on December 4, 2015. Abdulfatah Ahmed won the primary election polling 3,016 votes as the sole candidate.

PDP primary
Simon Ajibola won the primary election polling 941 votes against 10 other candidates. His closest rival was Dele Belgore, who came second with 130 votes, Gbemisola Rukayyat Saraki came third with 113 votes, Mokanjuola Ajadi scored 107 votes, Oba Abdulraheem scored 45 votes, Jani Ibrahim scored 27 votes, Alhaji Hakeem Lawal scored 13 votes, John Dara had 4 votes, Sunday Babalola and Kale Belgore had 3 and 1 votes respectively while Sanusi Abdullahi got no vote.

Results
A total number of 16 candidates registered with the Independent National Electoral Commission to contest in the election.

The total number of registered voters in the state was 1,171,561, while 455,397 voters were accredited. Total number of votes cast was 434,354, while number of valid votes was 419,633. Rejected votes were 14,721.

By local government area
Here are the results of the election by local government area for the two major parties. The total valid votes of 419,633 represents the 17 political parties that participated in the election. Blue represents LGAs won by Abdulfatah Ahmed. Green represents LGAs won by Simon Ajibola.

References 

Gubernatorial election 2015
Kwara State gubernatorial election
Kwara State gubernatorial elections